Reign in Hell is a 2008-2009 comic book miniseries written by Keith Giffen, pencilled by Thomas Derenick, inked by Bill Sienkiewicz and published by DC Comics. The title is a reference to a line spoken by Lucifer in John Milton's epic poem Paradise Lost: "Better to reign in Hell than serve in Heaven".

Plot
During the events of the Reign in Hell miniseries, Hell is thrown into a massive conflict as Neron and his generals are confronted with a rebellion led by Blaze and Satanus, the rulers of Purgatory. Neron soon discovered that the rebel demons were offering the damned "hope to the hopeless" and redemption for them, which had never happened before, and that this was a powerful spur. Realizing what would happen if the damned ever rose up against him, Neron has his consort Lilith, the "mother of all Earthborn fiends", summon all of the vampires, werewolves, ghouls and infernally powered humans to Hell to fight on his side.

This unrest in the infernal realms attracts the attention of Earth's magical superheroes, who are concerned about the outcome and the possible repercussions of the war. Many of them descend into Hell and take sides in the conflict (all for reasons of their own), including Giovanni "John" Zatara, his daughter Zatanna Zatara, Jason Blood a.k.a. Etrigan the Demon, Randu Singh, Doctor Fate V (Kent V. Nelson), the Ragman III (Rory Regan), the Creeper (Jack Ryder), Detective Chimp, the vampire Lord Andrew Bennett, Acheron, the angel Zauriel, the Enchantress, Deadman, the Phantom Stranger, Sargon the Sorcerer II (David John Sargent), Ibis the Invincible II (Daniel Kasim "Danny" Khalifa), the Nightmaster, Nightshade II (Eve Eden), the Midnight Rider, the Warlock's Daughter, Black Alice, Blue Devil, Red Devil and the fallen angel Linda Danvers. In the miniseries' backup story, Doctor Richard Occult, aided by the Yellow Peri, also descends into Hell, but separately from the others and with his own ulterior motive-to free the soul of his beloved, Rose Psychic, from damnation.

Lobo, who, at this time, is confined to the Labyrinth, Hell's only prison (due to the deal that he had earlier made with Neron during the Underworld Unleashed crossover event) and whose suffering alone is enough to power Neron's entire palace, is freed from his torment as a result of the titanic battle between Etrigan the Demon and Blue Devil, a battle which results in Etrigan the Demon's (temporary) death at Blue Devil's hands. Lobo then tears apart the soul of Zatara, which forces Zatanna to destroy his soul and banish it to the Abyss (a place that even Hell cannot touch) at his request, rather than to consign him to an eternity of pain and torment (later, in the 16-issue miniseries Zatanna (vol. 2) (July 2010–October 2011), Zatara's soul is shown to have been saved from destruction by a demon who owes him a favor).

Despite all of this and just when Neron seems to be victorious, Satanus finally reveals that he used the war as a cover in order to spread a modified viral version of DMN, the anagogic drug that changes humans into monsters and that he had used once before in order to destabilize Metropolis and confound Superman. This variation of DMN is airborne and, when combined with the speaking of the magic word "Shazam", it transforms Neron and all of Hell's demons into soulless humans, all except Lilith, who was not a true demon. It also causes all of the demonic entities that Neron has consumed over the millennia to be cast out of him. Satanus then beheads Neron and takes the throne of Hell for himself. The damned then turn their rage upon the now-human and powerless demons, slaughtering them wholesale and thus damning themselves anew.

Blaze later takes advantage of her brother's momentary weakness during a moment when he allows Black Alice to touch him and sample his powers; this action shatters Black Alice's psyche and allows Blaze to drain Satanus' power and take the throne for herself, thus winning the war. Near the end of the miniseries, the Unspoken Principium of Hell is revealed by Doctor Occult to be "You can leave whenever you want".

Collected editions
The miniseries was later collected in a trade paperback (DC Comics, October 2009, 256 pp.).

References

External links
 Reign in Hell Comic Book Database

DC Comics limited series
Comics by Keith Giffen
Fiction about purgatory